All bat species in the United States are insectivorous except for three nectar-eating species that migrate from Mexico and one fruit-eating species that inhabits the Florida Keys.

Species

Bats belong to the biological order of Chiroptera. The bat families found in North America are Vespertilionidae, Molossidae, Mormoopidae and Phyllostomidae.

Molossidae
Florida bonneted bat, Eumops floridanus
Wagner's bonneted bat, Eumops glaucinis
Western mastiff bat, Eumops perotis
Underwood's bonneted bat, Eumops underwoodi
Velvety free-tailed bat, Molossus molossus
Pocketed free-tailed bat, Nyctinomops femorosaccus
Big free-tailed bat, Nyctinomops macrotis
Mexican free-tailed bat, Tadarida brasiliensis

Mormoopidae
Ghost-faced bat, Mormoops megalophylla

Phyllostomidae
Jamaican fruit bat, Artibeus jamaicensis (Florida Keys only)
Mexican long-tongued bat, Choeronycteris mexicana
Mexican long-nosed bat, Leptonycteris nivalis
California leaf-nosed bat, Macrotus californicus

Vespertilionidae
Pallid bat, Antrozous pallidus
Rafinesque's big-eared bat, Corynorhinus rafinesquii
Townsend's big-eared bat, Corynorhinus townsendii
Big brown bat, Eptesicus fuscus
Spotted bat, Euderma maculatum
Allen's big-eared bat, Idionycteris phyllotis
Silver-haired bat, Lasionycteris noctivagans
Western red bat, Lasiurus blossevillii
Eastern red bat, Lasiurus borealis
Hoary bat, Lasiurus cinereus
Southern yellow bat, Lasiurus ega
Seminole bat, Lasiurus seminolus
Southwestern myotis, Myotis auriculus
Southeastern myotis, Myotis austroriparius
California myotis, Myotis californicus
Western small-footed myotis, Myotis ciliolabrum
Long-eared myotis, Myotis evotis
Gray bat, Myotis grisescens
Keen's myotis, Myotis keenii
Eastern small-footed myotis, Myotis leibii
Little brown bat, Myotis lucifugus
Arizona myotis, Myotis occultus
Northern long-eared myotis, Myotis septentrionalis
Indiana bat, Myotis sodalis
Fringed myotis, Myotis thysanodes
Cave myotis, Myotis velifer
Long-legged myotis, Myotis volans
Yuma myotis, Myotis yumanensis
Evening bat, Nycticeius humeralis
Canyon bat, Parastrellus hesperus
Tricolored bat, Perimyotis subflavus

Notable bat roosts
In 2009 the Grandview Mine in the Grand Canyon National Park had gates added to support on-going bat research, preserve historic mine resources, and promote visitor safety.

The Ann W. Richards Congress Avenue Bridge, which crosses over Lady Bird Lake in Austin, Texas, is the world's largest urban bat colony.

Seventeen species of bats live in the Carlsbad Caverns National Park, including a large number of Mexican free-tailed bats. It has been estimated that the population of Mexican free-tailed bats once numbered in the millions but has declined drastically in modern times. The cause of this decline is unknown but the pesticide DDT is often listed as a primary cause.

State insignia

As of February 2011, at least three states had an official bat. Hawai'i named the Hawaiian hoary bat as the official state land mammal in April 2015. The general assembly of North Carolina considered a bill in 2007 that would have made Rafinesque's big-eared bat as its state bat. The bill passed 92-15, but died in the state senate. In 2020, the big brown bat was designated the official state mammal of the District of Columbia.

See also

Environment of the United States

References

External links

"The Art and Science of Bats". Smithsonian Institution.

 
Bats